AD 41 (XLI) was a common year starting on Sunday (link will display the full calendar) of the Julian calendar. At the time, it was known as the Year of the Consulship of C. Caesar Augustus Germanicus and Cn. Sentius Saturninus (or, less frequently, year 794 Ab urbe condita). The denomination AD 41 for this year has been used since the early medieval period, when the Anno Domini calendar era became the prevalent method in Europe for naming years.

Events

By place

Roman Empire 
 January 24
 Caligula, known for his eccentricity and cruel despotism, is assassinated by his disgruntled Praetorian Guards.
 Claudius succeeds his nephew, Caligula, as emperor.
 January 25 – After a night of negotiation, Claudius is accepted as emperor by the Senate.
 Claudius makes Agrippa king of Judea.
 Messalina, wife of Claudius, persuades Claudius to have Seneca the Younger banished to Corsica on a charge of adultery with Julia Livilla.
 Claudius restores religious freedom to Jews throughout the empire, but prohibits Jews in Rome from proselytising.
 An attack across the Rhine by the Germans is stopped by the Romans.

China 
 Emperor Guang Wu of the Han Dynasty deposes his wife, Guo Shengtong, as empress, and makes his consort Yin Lihua empress in her place.

By topic

Births 
 February 12 – Tiberius Claudius Caesar Britannicus, son of Claudius (d. AD 55)

Deaths 
 January 24
 Caligula, Roman emperor (assassinated) (b. 12 AD)
 Julia Drusilla, daughter of Caligula (assassinated) (b. 39 AD)
 Milonia Caesonia, wife of Caligula (assassinated) (b. 6 AD)
 Asprenas Calpurnius Serranus, Roman politician 
 Gnaeus Domitius Ahenobarbus, Roman consul (b. 17 BC)
 Julia Livilla, daughter of Germanicus (starved to death) (b. 18 AD)

References 

0041

als:40er#41